The Gramophone Records Museum and Research Centre of Ghana (GRMRC) is a museum dedicated to preserving Ghanaian recordings. It was founded by Kwame Sarpong and opened to the public in December 1994. It is located in the Centre for National Culture in Cape Coast.

In 2003, the Daniel Langlois Foundation for the Art, Science and Technology in Canada began sponsoring a project to digitise Highlife recordings from the museum's collections.  Some of the museum's holdings have been transferred to CD for the Archive of Folk Culture at the Library of Congress's American Folklife Center.

See also 
 List of music museums

References
Citations

Bibliography

1994 establishments in Ghana
Museums in Ghana
Music museums
Music organisations based in Ghana
Museums established in 1994
Cape Coast